Reisman is a surname of German-Jewish Ashkenazic origin (Hebrew: רייזמן)

 Barry Reisman, radio host
 Chris Reisman (born 1978), American basketball coach
 Del Reisman (1924–2011), television producer, story editor and screenwriter
 Garrett Reisman (born 1968), American engineer and NASA astronaut
 George Reisman (born 1937), American professor of economics at Pepperdine University
 Heather Reisman (born 1948), Canadian businesswoman and CEO of Indigo Books
 Judith Reisman (1935–2021), American anti-pornography activist
 Leo Reisman (1897–1961), American violinist
 Linda Reisman, American film producer
 Lonn Reisman (born 1954), American basketball coach and athletic director
 Marty Reisman (1930–2012), American table tennis player
 Nancy Reisman (born 1961), American author and academic
 Ori Reisman, Israeli painter
 Rod Reisman, American drummer; original drummer of the band DEVO
 Sarah E Reisman, American chemist
 Simon Reisman (1919–2008), Canadian civil servant

See also
 Riesman

Jewish surnames
Yiddish-language surnames